The 2013–14 SMU Mustangs women's basketball team represents Southern Methodist University in the 2013–14 NCAA Division I women's basketball season. The Mustangs play their home games at Curtis Culwell Center and at Moody Coliseum. The 2013–14 season was their first season the Mustangs will participate in the American Athletic Conference. The Mustangs are coached by 23rd year head coach Rhonda Rompola. They finished the season with a record of 18–14 overall, 8–10 in the American Conference play. They lost in the quarterfinals of the 2014 American Athletic Conference women's basketball tournament to Rutgers. They were invited to the 2014 Women's National Invitation Tournament which they defeat Texas Southern in the first round before losing to Minnesota in the second round.

Roster

Schedule and results

|-
!colspan=9| Non-Conference Regular Season

|-
!colspan=9| Conference Regular Season

|-
!colspan=12| 2014 American Athletic Conference women's basketball tournament

|-
!colspan=12| 2014 Women's National Invitation Tournament

|-

See also
2013–14 SMU Mustangs men's basketball team

References

External links
SMU Mustangs men's basketball official website

SMU Mustangs women's basketball seasons
SMU